RNO may refer to:

RedNation Online, Canadian soccer website
Renault, French automobile company
Reno-Tahoe International Airport, in Washoe County, Nevada, United States
Russian National Orchestra, residing in Moscow
Knight of the Order of the Polar Star

See also 
R&O (disambiguation)